Bohdan Sukhodub (born 9 February 1994), is a professional Ukrainian football defender who plays for FC Sumy in the Ukrainian First League.

He is product of FC FC Frunzenets Sumy sportive school.

He made his début for FC Illichivets Mariupol in the Ukrainian Premier League on 19 October 2014.

References

External links

Ukrainian footballers
FC Mariupol players
PFC Sumy players
Ukrainian Premier League players
Association football defenders
1994 births
Living people